Voronezh State Technical University is a public university located in Voronezh, Russia.

History 
 August 28, 1956: founded as the Voronezh Evening Machine-Building Institute;
 July 17, 1958: reorganized into the Voronezh Evening Polytechnic Institute;
 June 19, 1962: reorganized into the Voronezh Polytechnic Institute (VPI);
 September 22, 1993: renamed Voronezh State Technical University (VSTU).
 March 17, 2016: by order of the Ministry of Education and Science of the Russian Federation No. 224, VSTU and Voronezh State University of Architecture and Civil Engineering are reorganized into a regional flagship university of the Voronezh region (by joining VGASU to VSTU).

Structure 
 Road transport faculty
 Cultural and educational faculty
 Faculty of Civil Engineering
 Faculty of Architecture and Urban Planning
 Faculty of Engineering Systems and Structures
 Faculty of Information Technology and Computer Security
 Faculty of Mechanical Engineering and Aerospace Engineering
 Faculty of Radio Engineering and Electronics
 Faculty of Economics, Management and Information Technology
 Faculty of Energy and Control Systems
 Military Training Center 
 Institute of International Education
 Construction Polytechnic College
 Graduate school

External links
 Voronezh State Technical University

Voronezh